Vedelago is a comune (municipality) in the Province of Treviso in the Italian region Veneto, located about  northwest of Venice, about  east of Vicenza, about  north of Padua and about  west of Treviso.

The main attraction is the Villa Emo, by Andrea Palladio, in the frazione Fanzolo.

References

Cities and towns in Veneto